The paludiscala de oro snail, scientific name Paludiscala caramba, is a species of freshwater snail, an aquatic gastropod mollusk in the family Hydrobiidae. This species is endemic to freshwater marshes in Coahuila State, Mexico.

Paludiscala caramba is the only species in the genus Paludiscala. Its specific name  is from a Spanish exclamation expressing surprise: "caramba". This name was given by its discoverer, the American malacologist Dwight Taylor, who said the name was a loose translation of his "original remarks at seeing the shells," which are surprisingly similar to those of a predominantly marine family, the wentletraps or Epitoniidae.

References

Paludiscala
Endemic molluscs of Mexico
Gastropods described in 1966
Taxonomy articles created by Polbot